The Bacterial protein tyrosine-kinase database (BYKdb) is a specialized database of computer-annotated bacterial tyrosine-kinases that share no resemblance with their eukaryotic counterparts.

See also
 Tyrosine-kinases

References

External links
 http://bykdb.ibcp.fr

Biological databases
Protein kinases